Tumor initiation is defined as "a process in which normal cells are changed so that they are able to form tumors". It is the first phase in tumor development.  Mutagens, substances that cause cancer can be tumor initiators.

See also 
 Tumor promotion
 Tumor progression

References

Carcinogenesis